Henri Mouton (16 August 1933 – 21 April 2021) was a Belgian politician. Mouton served in the Belgian Senate from 1981 to 1985.

Early life 

Mouton studied physical education at the Provincial Institute of Liège, graduating in 1956.

Mouton became the professor of physical education at the Athénée de Hannut in 1958, a position he remained in until 1981.

He became the director of the Lycée de Hannut in 1981.

Political career 
Mouton served in the Belgian Senate from 1981 to 1985.

Personal life 
Mouton died on 21 April 2021.

Honours 
Mouton was appointed a Commander of the Order of Leopold on 9 June 1999.

References 

1933 births
2021 deaths
People from Namur (province)
20th-century Belgian politicians
Socialist Party (Belgium) politicians
Order of Leopold (Belgium)